Jean Barbeyrac (15 March 1674 – 3 March 1744) was a French jurist.

Life
Born at Béziers in Lower Languedoc, he was the nephew of Charles Barbeyrac, a distinguished physician of Montpellier. He moved with his family into Switzerland after the Revocation of the Edict of Nantes. After spending some time at Geneva and Frankfurt am Main, he became professor of belles-lettres in the French school of Berlin. Then, in 1711, he was called to the professorship of history and civil law at Lausanne, finally settling as professor of public law at Groningen.

Works

His fame rests chiefly on the preface and notes to his translation of Samuel Pufendorf's treatise De Jure Naturae et Gentium, translated as Of the Law of Nature and Nations, 4th ed., 1729, London, by B. Kennett et al. Barbeyrac's preface appears in this fourth edition with the title: 'Containing an Historical and Critical Account of the Science of Morality, and the Progress It has Made in the World, From the Earliest Times Down to the Publication of This Work'. In the fundamental principles, he follows almost entirely John Locke and Pufendorf; but he works out with great skill the theory of moral obligation, referring it to the command or will of God. He indicates the distinction, developed more fully by Thomasius and Kant, between the legal and the moral qualities of action. The principles of international law he reduces to those of the law of nature, and in so doing opposes many of the positions taken up by Grotius. He rejects the notion that sovereignty in any way resembles property, and makes even marriage a matter of civil contract. Barbeyrac also translated Grotius's De Jure Belli et Pacis, Cumberland's De Legibus Naturae, and Pufendorf's smaller treatise De Officio Hominis et Civis.

Among his own productions are a treatise, De la morale des pères, a history of ancient treaties, Histoire des anciens traitez, contained in the Supplement au Corps universel diplomatique du droit des gens, and the curious Traité du jeu (1709), in which he defends the morality of games of chance.

References
 
 
 Fiammetta Palladini, Die Berliner Hugenotten und der Fall Barbeyrac. Orthodoxe und "Sozinianer" im Refuge (1685-1720) (Leiden, Brill, 2011) (Brill's Studies in Intellectual History, 204).

Further reading

External links
 

1674 births
1744 deaths
People from Béziers
French legal scholars
French Protestants